Becker's sign, or Becker's phenomenon, is the presence of visible (through an ophthalmoscope) pulsation of retinal arteries, found in patients with aortic insufficiency or Graves' disease.

The sign was named after Otto Heinrich Enoch Becker.

See also
 Corrigan's pulse
 De Musset's sign
 Muller's sign
 Quincke's sign
 Traube's sign
 Duroziez's sign
 Hill's sign
 Mayne's sign

References 

Medical signs